No Offence is a British television police procedural drama on Channel 4, created by Paul Abbott. It follows a team of detectives from Friday Street police station, a division of the Manchester Metropolitan Police (a fictional version of the Greater Manchester Police). The series stars Joanna Scanlan as the protagonist, Detective Inspector Viv Deering. The first series focuses on the team's investigation into the serial murders of young girls with Down syndrome.  It was renewed for two further runs. The second series of seven episodes began broadcasting on 4 January 2017, and follows the investigation into Manchester crime boss Nora Attah (Rakie Ayola). It was filmed on location in Manchester.

In the UK, the first episode of No Offence launched with 2.5 million viewers, Channel 4's biggest midweek drama launch for more than three years. Although subsequent episodes lost overnight viewers, dropping as low as 1.2 million, the weekly consolidated series average remained at 2.5 million and finished 47% up on Channel 4's slot average. In France, the first episode of No Offence aired on 29 February 2016 on France 2 and was watched by 5.46 million viewers, 20.4% of the TV audience. The next three episodes were shown back-to-back that evening and together achieved an average 4.6 million viewers, 19.3% of the TV audience.

A third series was confirmed in July 2017. Filming took place in Manchester in March 2018 and it began broadcasting on 13 September 2018. The six-episode series has a political focus, with the main storyline following the attempted murder of a local politician by a far right group. On 19 October 2018, Paul Abbott stated in an interview that he had begun working on ideas for a potential fourth series, but on 28 November 2019, Executive Producer Martin Carr confirmed on Twitter that the show would not be returning.

Plot
In the first series, DI Viv Deering is introduced as the dynamic but blunt leader of a team of detectives at a fictional police station within the 'Manchester Metropolitan Police'. DC Dinah Kowalska misses out on promotion to DS after leaving the scene after an impetuous foot chase results in a death. She then uncovers a link between a murder, a drowning and a disappearance: someone is killing girls with Down syndrome. While negotiating different cases, the team must solve the case as more girls come into danger. The prime suspect is killed whilst fleeing arrest, but Dinah and Viv separately conclude that Viv's husband is also involved.  Viv burns the evidence and plans to kill rather than arrest him, but he is killed by Cathy while she and Dinah are holding him at Viv's home.  With Viv they cover up their involvement before the body is found.

The second series begins a little over a year later, as Viv returns after extended leave and attends a gang funeral, which is bombed despite the police presence.

Cast

Main cast
 Joanna Scanlan as DI Vivenne Deering (Series 1–3)
 Elaine Cassidy as DC (Series 1–2) then DS Dinah Kowalska (Series 3)
 Alexandra Roach as DS Joy Freers (Series 1–3)
 Will Mellor as DC Spike Tanner (Series 1–3)
 Paul Ritter as Randolph Miller (Series 1–3)
 Colin Salmon as DSI Darren Maclaren (Series 1)
 Sarah Solemani as DCI Christine Lickberg (Series 2)
 Claire Rushbrook as DCI Marilyn Marchant (Series 3)
 Saira Choudhry as PC Tegan Thompson (Series 1–3)
 Tom Varey as PC Stuart O'Connell (Series 1–3)
 Ste Johnson as PC Jonah Mitchell (Series 1–3)
 Neet Mohan as PC Taz Ahmed (Series 1–2)

Recurring cast
 Charlie May-Clark as Cathy Calvert (Series 1–2)
 Claudia Adshead as Donna Calvert (Series 1–2)
 Kate O'Flynn as Dr Peep (Series 1–3)
 Conor MacNeill as Gavin (Series 2–3)
 Chook Sibtain as Sgt. Keith Pankani (Series 2)
 Risteárd Cooper as Laurie Gaskell (Series 1)
 Hanna Bieniuszewicz as Magda Kowalska (Series 1)
 Mia Blakeley as Tessa Kowalska (Series 1); Elizabeth Lomas as Tessa Kowalska (Series 3)
 Siobhán McSweeney as Ruth Cheetam (Series 1)
 Philip McGinley as Bob Simmons (Series 1)
 Ben Tavassoli as Alpha (Series 1)
 Daniel Ginty as Luke Hyatt (Series 1)
 Hannah Walters as Connie Ball (Series 1)
 Rakie Ayola as Nora Attah (Series 2)
 Zackary Momoh as Mani Attah (Series 2)
 Zak Sutcliffe as Kim Garvey (Series 2)
 Felix Scott as DS Ewan Murray (Series 2)
 Phil Dunster as Detective Chief Inspector Tom Pembroke (Series 3)
 Lisa McGrillis as Caroline McCoy (Series 3)
 Neil Maskell as Dennis Caddy (Series 3)
 Sharon Rooney as Faye Caddy (Series 3)
 Tamara Lawrance as Bonnie Sands (Series 3)
 Nigel Lindsay as Detective Chief Inspector Terry Taylor (Series 3)

Characters

Main
 Detective Inspector Vivenne Deering (Joanna Scanlan) is a cast-iron cop with a tough-love approach to managing her team. She is at the prime of her life and capable in her job. However, with a high-flying career comes a disintegrating home life.
  Detective Constable / Detective Sergeant Dinah Kowalska (Elaine Cassidy) is a strong yet impulsive member of the team. She is passed over for a promotion to sergeant following a stupid mistake, and it's not long before she makes another move in following her emotions, which threatens her job. She lives with her eccentric Polish mother Magda and her teenage daughter Tessa.
 Detective Sergeant Joy Freers (Alexandra Roach) is an equally brilliant detective but one who is shy of the spotlight. Her promotion to sergeant ahead of Dinah removes her from her comfort zone; if only she recognised her own brilliance behind her anxiety.
 Detective Constable Spike Tanner (Will Mellor) is a risk-taking headstrong man amongst the powerful women of the group. He provides emotional glue for the group, but he is also a cheeky fun-loving guy.
 Randolph Miller (Paul Ritter) is an eccentric in forensics, despite the team's general despair of his lacklustre attitude to the job. Often hungover, it's lucky Randolph's a maverick who's amazing at his job.
 Detective Superintendent Darren Maclaren (Colin Salmon) is the big boss who even Viv has to answer to. He is straight-talking but manipulative; he is the only man who can take on Viv, and even then she's more than a handful.
 Detective Chief Inspector Christine Lickberg (Sarah Solemani) is Viv's new boss in the second series. She's not afraid to question Viv's decisions, and does not intend to make friends of the team.
 Detective Chief Inspector Marilyn Marchant (Claire Rushbrook) is Viv's new boss in the third series, who provides both support to Viv and firm leadership depending on what the moment requires.
 PC Tegan Thompson (Saira Choudhry) is a tough and ambitious officer.  She refuses to suffer fools and has a good relationship with her police partner Stuart; is there a hint of romance?
 PC Stuart O'Connell (Tom Varey) is a smart and switched-on policeman, and Tegan's partner. He aims to make sergeant, but he cannot get drawn into the trouble his colleagues like to indulge in.
 PC Jonah Mitchell (Ste Johnson) is overweight and mischievous, yet enthusiastic; he is Taz's partner.
 PC Taz Ahmed (Neet Mohan) is a happy-go-lucky yet calming influence on the team, and Jonah's partner.

Recurring

Multiple Series
 Cathy Calvert (Charlie May-Clark) is a young woman from a broken home who becomes a person of interest for the team after she becomes a target for a serial killer. She later stays with Dinah and her family, thus developing a familial bond with Dinah. 
 Donna Calvert (Claudia Adshead) is Cathy's older sister and a former drug addict attempting to turn her life around. Her role as Nora Attah's hairdresser brings her into more professional contact with Viv's team in the second series. 
 Dr Peep (Kate O'Flynn) is a longtime friend of Dinah's and consultant psychiatrist working with the police on cases requiring her psychological expertise. 
 Tessa Kowalska (Mia Blakeley, Series 1 & Elizabeth Lomas, Series 3) is Dinah's teenage daughter and Magda's granddaughter. 
 Gavin (Conor MacNeill) is a civilian support worker within Viv's unit, replacing Connie Ball from the second series onwards.

Series 1
 Laurie Gaskell (Risteárd Cooper) is Viv's husband and an aspiring musician, who often takes issue with the hours required for Viv's job. 
 Magda Kowalska (Hanna Bieniuszewicz) is Dinah's mother and Tessa's grandmother who lives with the family. 
 Ruth Cheetham (Siobhán McSweeney) is a nurse at one of the local Accident & Emergency departments who occasionally comes into contact with the team and later dates Jonah. 
 Patrick Llewellyn (Peter McDonald) is a social worker and community group leader for young people with Down's Syndrome who encounters Viv's unit during their investigation into a serial killer.
 Alpha (Ben Tavassoli) is the boyfriend of Cathy Calvert and the father of her child. 
 Connie Ball (Hannah Walters) is a civilian support worker within Viv's unit, dealing with administrative matters relevant to their cases.

Series 2
 Nora Attah (Rakie Ayola) is a major crime boss in Manchester, heading up the Nigerian crime syndicate that is in direct competition with the Irish Mob. Nora has also known Viv for a long time and the two are frequent opponents across the police/criminal divide. 
 Mani Attah (Zackary Momoh) is Nora's son and a senior figure in her crime syndicate. Mani harbours hopes of succeeding Nora, even as his mother frequently takes issue with his decisions and instincts. 
 Kim Garvey (Zak Sutcliffe) is a young offender and petty criminal with connections to the Attah family. 
 Detective Sergeant Ewan Murray (Felix Scott) is an officer within the Child Protection Unit, who becomes involved with Viv's unit when they come across a case of child exploitation connected to the Attah family. 
 Sergeant Keith Pankani (Chook Sibtain) is the officer in charge of the custody suite within the police station where Viv's unit is based. 
 Aidan McGee (Jody Latham) is a war veteran and former criminal attempting to set his life on the right course whilst dealing with a recent bereavement, a case that is the subject of an investigation by Viv's unit.

Series 3
 Detective Chief Inspector Tom Pembroke (Phil Dunster) is a member of Special Branch who clashes with Viv when her investigation into the assassination attempt on Caroline McCoy conflicts with an undercover Special Branch inquiry into Albion.
 Caroline McCoy (Lisa McGrillis) is a local businesswoman and longtime family friend of Viv, who knew Caroline's mother. Caroline is running for Mayor of Greater Manchester as an independent candidate, pledging to bring communities together, which causes her to face an assassination attempt.
 Dennis Caddy (Neil Maskell) is the leader of Albion, a local extreme far-right group based in Manchester, who is well known to the police. 
 Faye Caddy (Sharon Rooney) is the younger sister of Dennis Caddy and deputy leader of Albion, supporting her brother's far-right political efforts. 
 Bonnie Sands (Tamara Lawrance) is the girlfriend of Albion leader Dennis Caddy and raises suspicion from Viv's unit at the start of their investigation into the assassination attempt on McCoy.
 Kashif Hassan (Ace Bhatti) is the incumbent Mayor of Greater Manchester and running for re-election against a field of candidates that includes Caroline McCoy. 
 Lionel Durkin (Patrick Baladi) is the owner of Pellinore, a private security company with interests all across Manchester. Durkin also runs several charities on behalf of war veterans whilst financially supporting Albion at the same time.
 Detective Chief Inspector Terry Taylor (Nigel Lindsay) is a zealous, politically motivated senior officer allied with Caroline McCoy and who clashes with Viv when appointed as her superior.

Episode list

Series 1 (2015)

Series 2 (2017)

Series 3 (2018)

Reception

Awards and nominations

DVD
The complete Series One and Two were released on 10 August 2015, as well as a boxset containing both series. The complete Series Three was released on 22 October 2018, along with a complete collection containing all three series.

References

External links
 
 
 

2015 British television series debuts
2018 British television series endings
2010s British black comedy television series
2010s British comedy-drama television series
2010s British crime drama television series
2010s British crime comedy television series
2010s British police procedural television series
2010s British workplace comedy television series
2010s British workplace drama television series
British detective television series
Channel 4 comedy dramas
Channel 4 crime television shows
Down syndrome in television
English-language television shows
Television shows set in Manchester